Kalateh-ye Seyyed Ali (also Romanized as Kalāteh-ye Seyyed ‘Alī) is a village in Zibad Rural District, Kakhk District, Gonabad County, Razavi Khorasan Province, Iran. At the 2006 census, its population was 18, in 9 families.

References 

Populated places in Gonabad County